Borka may refer to:

Places
Bôrka, a village and municipality in Slovakia
Borka, Kamrup, a village in Assam, India
 Borka, former name of the island of Piirissaar, Estonia

People
 Borka (given name)
 Gyula Borka (b. 1959), Hungarian athlete

Other
Borka: The Adventures of a Goose With No Feathers, a children's book by John Burningham